Irene Nafuna Muloni is a Ugandan electrical engineer, businesswoman and politician and also a Senior Presidential Advisor to Ugandan President Yoweri Kaguta Museveni.
She was previously Cabinet Minister for Energy and Minerals in the Ugandan Cabinet until December 2019, serving from 27 May 2011. 
She retained her position in the new cabinet after the 2016 national elections. She served as the elected Member of Parliament for Bulambuli District Women's Representative, from 2011 until 2016 when she lost her seat to Independent candidate; Sarah Wekomba.
She again regained her seat after the 2021 general elections.

Background and education
She was born on 18 November 1960, in what is known today, as Bulambuli District. She attended Budadiri Girls' Primary School before entering Gayaza High School. In 1982, she entered Makerere University, the oldest university in East Africa, to study Engineering. In 1986, she graduated with an honours Bachelor of Science in Electrical Engineering (BSc.E.Eng) degree. Later, she graduated with the degree of Master of Business Administration (MBA), from Capella University in Minneapolis, Minnesota, United States. She is also a Certified Public-Private Partnership Specialist, accredited by The Institute for Public-Private Partnerships, Inc. (IP3) and the Water, Engineering and Development Centre (WEDC) of Loughborough University.

Career

Since 1986 Irene has been working with the Uganda Electricity Distribution Company Limited (UEDCL), a Ugandan parastatal company, responsible for distribution of electrical power to both commercial and retail customers nationwide and Uganda Posts & Telecommunications Corporation  first Pupil Engineer in 1986 for (UPTC), as an Executive Engineers for same,as the  Communications Engineer in 1991 then as  Senior Communications Engineer in 1995 then as Senior Protection Engineer then after  the Managing Director of Uganda Electricity Distribution Company Limited. In 2011, she entered elective politics, by successfully contesting for the Bulambuli District Women's Representative in the 9th Ugandan Parliament (2011 - 2016). On 27 May 2011, she was appointed Minister of Energy & Minerals, by President Yoweri Museveni. She replaced Hilary Onek, who was appointed Minister of Internal Affairs. In the cabinet changes made on 6 June 2016, she maintained her cabinet appointment.

See also
Cabinet of Uganda
Parliament of Uganda
Bulambuli District

References

External links
Full of List of Ugandan Cabinet Ministers May 2011

1960 births
Living people
Government ministers of Uganda
Members of the Parliament of Uganda
Ugandan women engineers
Ugandan electrical engineers
People from Bulambuli District
Makerere University alumni
Capella University alumni
Women government ministers of Uganda
Women members of the Parliament of Uganda
21st-century women engineers
People educated at Gayaza High School
National Resistance Movement politicians
21st-century Ugandan politicians
21st-century Ugandan women politicians
21st-century Ugandan women scientists
21st-century Ugandan scientists